Ribeirão Vermelho is a Brazilian municipality located in the state of Minas Gerais. The city belongs to the mesoregion of Campo das Vertentes and to the microregion of Lavras.  In 2020, the estimated population was 4,047.

See also
 List of municipalities in Minas Gerais

References

Municipalities in Minas Gerais